Semahat Sevim Arsel (born 1928) is a Turkish billionaire businesswoman. She is a director of Koç Holding, the largest industrial conglomerate in Turkey, and the eldest child of its founder, Vehbi Koç (1901–1996). She owns 8.4% of the family business. As of August 2022, her net worth was estimated at US$1.6 billion.

Early life
Arsel was born in Ankara in 1928, the eldest child of Vehbi Koç (1901-1996).

Arsel graduated from the American College for Girls in Istanbul.

Career
Arsel founded the Koç University School of Nursing. As of August 2021, Forbes estimated her net worth at US$1.9 billion. Arsel is the chairperson of the Vehbi Koç Foundation.

Personal life
Her husband Nusret Arsel died in January 2014. They had no children. She lives in Istanbul.

References

1928 births
Living people
Female billionaires
Koç family
Robert College alumni
Turkish billionaires
20th-century Turkish businesspeople
21st-century Turkish businesspeople